The 1888 Dartmouth football team represented Dartmouth College as a member of the Eastern Intercollegiate Football Association (EIFA) during the 1888 college football season. Dartmouth compiled an overall record of 3–4 with a mark of 3–1 in EIFA play.

Schedule

References

Dartmouth
Dartmouth Big Green football seasons
Dartmouth football